Sikul Himatk is a populated place situated in Pima County, Arizona, United States.

From 1893 to 1912, the location was known as Vaheja. Historically, it has also been called Siclehema, Sikulhamakt, Sikulhamatk, and Sikulhimat. In 1941, the Board on Geographic Names changed the official name to Sikul Himatk, which is O'odham meaning "water going around", due to it being situated between two watersheds.

References

Populated places in Pima County, Arizona